Henry Njobi Elad (born June 10, 1985) is a Cameroonian football player last played for Perseru Serui in Indonesia Soccer Championship.

Honours

Honours

Club honours
Barito Putera
Liga Indonesia Premier Division (1): 2011-12

Honours
•Champions:

Indonesian Premier Division 2011-2012

Clubs: PS Barito Putera.

References

1985 births
Living people
Cameroonian footballers
Cameroonian expatriate footballers
Cameroonian expatriate sportspeople in Indonesia
Expatriate footballers in Indonesia
Liga 1 (Indonesia) players
PS Barito Putera players
Association football defenders